Ante Čović (born 31 August 1975) is a Croatian-German professional football manager and former player who was most recently the manager of Bundesliga club Hertha BSC.

Managerial career

Hertha BSC II (2013–2019)
Čović was head coach of Hertha BSC's U–19 team until 21 November 2013. At this point, he became head coach of Hertha BSC II. His first match at the helm was a 5–2 win against SV Babelsberg 03 on 24 November 2013. Hertha BSC II finished the 2013–14 season in 12th place, three spots above the relegation zone. Then Hertha BSC II started the 2014–15 season with a 1–0 loss against Budissa Bautzen. The first win of the season was a 3–0 victory on matchday three in a Berlin derby against Dynamo Berlin.

Hertha BSC (2019)
He was appointed head coach of the first team on 1 July 2019. On 27 November 2019, Čović and Hertha BSC agreed to terminate his contract following poor results, with the side languishing in 15th place. He was replaced by Jürgen Klinsmann.

Personal life 
His son Maurice is also a footballer.

Managerial statistics

References

External links

1975 births
Living people
Footballers from Berlin
Association football midfielders
Croatian footballers
Croatia under-21 international footballers
VfB Stuttgart players
1. FC Nürnberg players
Hertha BSC players
Hertha BSC II players
VfL Bochum players
1. FC Saarbrücken players
Bundesliga players
2. Bundesliga players
Croatian football managers
Hertha BSC managers
Bundesliga managers